Lin Yi-chun (born July 5, 1981 in Taoyuan (now Taoyuan District, Taoyuan City)) is a Taiwanese sport shooter. She won two medals, gold and silver, in the women's double trap, at the 2001 and 2002 ISSF World Shooting Championships in Cairo, Egypt and Lahti, Finland, respectively. She also captured a bronze medal in the women's trap at the 2006 Asian Games in Doha, Qatar, accumulating a score of 80 clay pigeons and a bonus of 1 target from a shoot-off.

Representing Chinese Taipei, Lin made her official debut at the 2000 Summer Olympics in Sydney, where she competed in the women's double trap only. She scored a total of 134 targets (100 in the preliminary rounds and 34 in the final), and a bonus of 14 from a shoot-off (against Canada's Cynthia Meyer).  She finished in fourth place, narrowly missing out on the medal by five points behind defending Olympic champion Kim Rhode. At the 2004 Summer Olympics, Lin placed eighth in the qualifying rounds of the women's double trap, one point behind Australia's Susan Trindall after the final attempt, accumulating a score of 106 targets.

Eight years after competing in her last Olympics, Lin qualified for her third Chinese Taipei team, as a 31-year-old, at the 2012 Summer Olympics in London, by placing third in the women's trap at the 2011 ISSF World Cup series in Beijing, China. She scored a total of 68 clay pigeons in the qualifying rounds of the women's trap, one point ahead of U.S. shooter and Beijing bronze medalist Corey Cogdell.  She finished in tenth place.

References

External links
NBC Olympics Profile

1981 births
Living people
Taiwanese female sport shooters
Olympic shooters of Taiwan
Shooters at the 2000 Summer Olympics
Shooters at the 2004 Summer Olympics
Shooters at the 2012 Summer Olympics
Shooters at the 2016 Summer Olympics
Asian Games medalists in shooting
People from Taoyuan District
Shooters at the 1998 Asian Games
Shooters at the 2002 Asian Games
Shooters at the 2006 Asian Games
Shooters at the 2010 Asian Games
Shooters at the 2014 Asian Games
Shooters at the 2018 Asian Games
Asian Games silver medalists for Chinese Taipei
Asian Games bronze medalists for Chinese Taipei
Medalists at the 2006 Asian Games
Medalists at the 2018 Asian Games
Sportspeople from Taoyuan City